Young Brothers, Ltd. is a shipment company, mainly doing inter island shipments business in Hawaii, U.S. It was established in 1913 in Honolulu, and is now a subsidiary of Foss Maritime, under Saltchuk Resources of Seattle, Washington.

Timeline
 In 1900, brothers Herb and William Young left San Francisco and arrived in Honolulu, Hawaii. Within a year, they started business in Honolulu Harbor. Soon after, a third brother, Jack, joined them.

 In 1913, the three brothers established Young Brothers, Ltd., with its main business of ocean towing, rescue service and barge transportation between the islands. About that time they were awarded with the contract of shipping pineapples from Molokai Island to Honolulu for canning.

 In 1961, Young Brothers separated harbor support service from shipping service by establishing a subsidiary, Hawaiian Tug & Barge.

 In 1999, Young Brothers was sold to Saltchuk Resources of Seattle, Washington, and, since 2013, has been part of Saltchuk' Foss Maritime subsidiary.

 Hawaii's interisland shipment service had been by Young Brothers only until 2018, when Pasha Hawaii Transport Lines LLC was approved as an additional shipper.

See also
Matson, Inc.
Pasha Hawaii

References

External links
Official Website
Move & Care Movers
Movers New Rochelle

Shipping companies of the United States
Transportation companies of the United States
Transportation companies based in Hawaii
2013 establishments in Hawaii
Companies based in Honolulu
Business in Hawaii